Vrtača is a small remote settlement in the Gorjanci Hills in the Municipality of Kostanjevica na Krki in eastern Slovenia, right on the border with Croatia. The area is part of the traditional region of Lower Carniola. It is now included in the Lower Sava Statistical Region.

References

External links
Vrtača on Geopedia

Populated places in the Municipality of Kostanjevica na Krki